Halls Bayou is a bayou in the northern part of Houston, Texas. It empties into Greens Bayou in Brock Park and Golf Course. It gets its name after Isaac Dolan Hall bought the land.

See also
List of rivers of Texas

External links
 The University of Houston Digital Library has a collection of historical photographs about Houston, nearby communities, and more. View these collections at 

Preservation websites
 Bayou Preservation

Rivers of Houston
History of Houston
Rivers of Texas